This is a list of schools in Central Province, Papua New Guinea.

Papua New Guinea's education system is divided into two sections: the international school system, which is administered by the International Education Agency and offers a standard of education based on Australian or British school systems or the International Baccalaureate; and the national school system, which consists of elementary (K–2), primary (3–8) and secondary (9–11) schools. Competitive examinations are held in year 10 for entry into the country's four national high schools, of which one is located in Port Moresby, and another in Sogeri.

Elementary and primary schools

Secondary and vocational schools

See also

 Education in Papua New Guinea
 List of schools in Papua New Guinea
 List of schools in Port Moresby

Schools, Central Province

Schools, Central Province